Yeboah Amankwah (born 19 October 2000) is an English professional footballer who plays as a defender for Belgian First Division B club Lommel.

Career
Amankwah joined Manchester City from Croydon based charity Kinetic Academy in December 2016. He joined League One side Rochdale in September 2020 on a loan to the end of the 2020–21 season. He made his professional debut on 8 September in a 2–1 EFL Trophy win at Morecambe, playing the first 72 minutes of the match. A week later he played the entirety of a 2–0 home defeat to Sheffield Wednesday in the EFL Cup, but sustained a knee injury in the match that saw him recalled from his loan the following month.

He moved on loan to Accrington Stanley in August 2021.

Amankwah signed for Lommel in September 2022.

References

External links
 

1999 births
Living people
English footballers
Association football defenders
Manchester City F.C. players
Rochdale A.F.C. players
Accrington Stanley F.C. players
Lommel S.K. players
English Football League players
English expatriate footballers
English expatriates in Belgium
Expatriate footballers in Belgium